Over Fly Over is the fifth album by Kathryn Williams. It was released on CAW Records on 9 May 2005.

The Guardian newspaper thought the songs "beautifully wrought and not without its own kind of gentle surprises", and MusicOMH called it "the sound of a woman reborn...her best album yet". The BBC, however, suggested "it feels over produced, undercooked, slipping through one ear and falling out the other."

Track listing 
 Three – 4:19
 Indifference #1 – 3:01
 Breath – 3:48
 Old Low Light #2 – 4:37  
 Just Like A Birthday – 3:38  
 Shop Window – 2:36  
 Beachy Head – 5:35  
 Escaping – 3:10  
 City Streets – 4:14  
 Untilt The Dark – 1:56  
 Baby Blues – 3:51  
 Full Colour – 3:52

Personnel 
 Kathryn Williams – guitar, vocals, piano, percussion & backing vocals
 Laura Reid – cello, piano & backing vocals
 David Scott – guitar, organ & backing vocals
 Keith Morris - bass clarinet 
 Johnny Bridgwood – double bass & “noises”
 Alex Tustin – drums & percussion
 Steve Honest – pedal steel guitar
 Graham Hardy – flugelhorn & trumpet
 Brendan Murphy – vibraphone
 Jo Montgomery – violin

Recording details 
All songs written by Kathryn Williams except:

Track 1 – written by Kathryn Williams, David Scott & Laura Reid

Track 2 – written by Kathryn Williams & David Scott

Track 8 & 10 – written by Kathryn Williams & Laura Reid

Recorded by Dave Maughan in Newcastle and Darius Kedros in London.

References 

Kathryn Williams albums
Music in Newcastle upon Tyne
2005 albums